Merizocera is a genus of six eyed spiders in the family Psilodercidae, first described by Jean-Louis Fage in 1912.

Species
, the World Spider Catalog accepts the following species:

Merizocera baoshan Li, 2020 – China
Merizocera betong Li, 2020 – Thailand
Merizocera brincki Brignoli, 1975 – Sri Lanka
Merizocera colombo Li, 2020 – Sri Lanka
Merizocera crinita (Fage, 1929) – Malaysia
Merizocera cruciata (Simon, 1893) (type species) – Sri Lanka
Merizocera galle Li, 2020 – Sri Lanka
Merizocera hponkanrazi Li, 2020 – Myanmar
Merizocera kachin Li, 2020 – Myanmar
Merizocera kandy Li, 2020 – Sri Lanka
Merizocera krabi Li, 2020 – Thailand
Merizocera kurunegala Li, 2020 – Sri Lanka
Merizocera lincang Li, 2020 – China
Merizocera mainling Li, 2020 – China
Merizocera mandai Li, 2020 – Singapore
Merizocera nyingchi Li, 2020 – China
Merizocera oryzae Brignoli, 1975 – Sri Lanka
Merizocera peraderiya Li, 2020 – Sri Lanka
Merizocera phuket Li, 2020 – Thailand
Merizocera picturata (Simon, 1893) – Sri Lanka
Merizocera putao Li, 2020 – Myanmar
Merizocera pygmaea Deeleman-Reinhold, 1995 – Thailand
Merizocera ranong Li, 2020 – Thailand
Merizocera ratnapura Li, 2020 – Sri Lanka
Merizocera salawa Li, 2020 – Sri Lanka
Merizocera stellata (Simon, 1905) – Indonesia (Java)
Merizocera tak Li, 2020 – Thailand
Merizocera tanintharyi Li, 2020 – Myanmar
Merizocera tengchong Li, 2020 – China
Merizocera thenna Li, 2020 – Sri Lanka
Merizocera uva Li, 2020 – Sri Lanka
Merizocera wenshan Li, 2020 – China
Merizocera wui Li, 2020 – Myanmar
Merizocera yala Li, 2020 – Thailand
Merizocera yuxi Li, 2020 – China

References 

Psilodercidae
Araneomorphae genera
Spiders of Asia